Elizaveta may refer to:

People

 Elizaveta Arzamasova (born 1995), Russian actress
 Elizaveta Akhmatova (1820–1904), Russian writer, publisher and translator
 Elizaveta Axenova (born 1995), Russian-born Kazakhstani luger
 Elizaveta Bagriana (1893–1991), Bulgarian poet
 Elizaveta Bagryantseva (1929–1996), Russian discus thrower
 Elizaveta Bem (1843–1914), Russian painter
 Elizaveta Boyarskaya (born 1985), Russian theater and film actress
 Elizaveta Bykova (1913–1989), Soviet chess player
 Elizaveta Chesnokova (born 1996), Russian freestyle skier
 Elizaveta Dementyeva (born 1928), Soviet sprint canoer
 Elizaveta Dubrovina (born 1993), Russian acrobatic gymnast
 Elizaveta Ermolaeva (born 1930), Soviet middle-distance runner
 Elizaveta Ersberg (1882-1942), Russian parlormaid to the Imperial family
 Elizaveta Glinka (1962–2016), Russian humanitarian
 Elizaveta Golovanova (born 1993), Russian model and beauty pageant titleholder
 Elizaveta Goreva (1859–1917), Russian theatre actress and entrepreneur
 Elizaveta Grechishnikova (born 1983), Russian long-distance runner
 Elizaveta Ivanovna Dmitrieva (1887–1928), Russian poet
 Elizaveta Karamihailova (1897–1968), Bulgarian physicist
 Elizaveta Kazelina (born 1996), Russian speed skater
 Elizaveta Khripounova, Russian-American pianist, singer/songwriter and opera singer
 Elizaveta Khudaiberdieva (born 2002), Russian ice dancer
 Elizaveta Klyuchereva (born 1999), Russian pianist
 Elizaveta Kovalskaya (1849 or 1851–1943), Russian revolutionary, narodnik, and founding member of Black Repartition
 Elizaveta Kruglikova (1865–1941), Russian-Soviet painter, etcher, silhouettist and monotypist
 Elizaveta Kulichkova (born 1996), Russian tennis player
 Elizaveta Lavrovskaya (1845–1919), Russian mezzo-soprano
 Elizaveta Levshina (born 1991), Russian pair skater
 Elizaveta Litvinova (1845–c.1919), Russian mathematician and pedagogue
 Elizaveta Lugovskikh (born 2000), Russian rhythmic gymnast
 Elizaveta Makarova (born 1994), Russian pair skater
 Elizaveta Malakhova (born 1993), Ukrainian chess player
 Elizaveta Malashenko (born 1996), Russian handballer
 Elizaveta Mavrikievna (1865–1927), Russian Grand Duchess
 Elizaveta Mukasei (1912–2009), Soviet spy
 Elizaveta Narishkina (1838–1928), Russian noblewoman, court official and memoirist
 Elizaveta Nazarenkova (born 1995), Russian rhythmic gymnast
 Elizaveta Nugumanova (born 2002), Russian figure skater
 Elizaveta Osetinskaya (born 1977), Russian journalist and media manager
 Elizaveta Oshurkova (born 1991), Ukrainian-born Russian racing cyclist
 Elizaveta Ostrogska (1539–1582), Ruthenian heiress
 Elizaveta Petrovna (1709–1762), Empress of Russia
 Elizaveta Posadskikh (born 1994), Russian BMX freestyle cyclist
 Elizaveta Ryzih (born 1988), German pole vault athlete
 Elizaveta Savlinis (born 1987), Russian track and field sprinte
 Elizaveta Stekolnikova (born 1974), Kazakhstani ice dancer
 Elizaveta Alexandrovna Stroganova (1779–1818), Russian aristocrat
 Elizaveta Svilova (1900–1975), Russian filmmaker and film editor
 Elizaveta Tarakhovskaya (1891–1968), Russian poet, playwright, translator, and author of children's books
 Elizaveta Tichtchenko (born 1975), Russian volleyball player
 Elizaveta Tuktamysheva (born 1996), Russian figure skater
 Elizaveta Ukolova (born 1998), Czech figure skater
 Elizaveta Vodovozova (1844–1923), Russian children's writer, educational theorist and memoirist
 Elizaveta Vorontsova (1739–1792), mistress of Emperor Peter III of Russia
 Elizaveta Voronyanskaya (died 1973), assistant of the Russian writer Aleksandr Solzhenitsyn
 Elizaveta Yulyevna Zarubina (1900–1987), Soviet spy and podpolkovnik of the MGB
 Elizaveta Zvantseva (1864–1921), Russian painter and art instructor

Places
 Elizaveta, a place in Moldavia

See also
 Elizabeth (given name)
 Elizabeth (disambiguation)
 Elisaveta (disambiguation)
 Jelisaveta (disambiguation)